Gorslwyd is an area in the community of Llanddona, Ynys Môn, Wales, which is 131.5 miles (211.5 km) from Cardiff and 209.1 miles (336.5 km) from London.

References

See also 
 List of localities in Wales by population

Villages in Anglesey